Un-balanced is a 1995 album by Japanese pop singer Ken Hirai.

Track list

1 Futari no Meiro 二人の迷路  
  
2 Negative  
 
3 Precious Junk 
  
4 Egao 笑顔
  
5 Katahō zutsu no Ear phone 片方ずつのイヤフォン

6 Easy
  
7 Yaburitai 破りたい
 
8 Aozora 青空
  
9 Hanabira 花びら
  
10 White: Boku ni Aitai (僕に会いたい)
  
11 Star

External links
 

1995 albums
Ken Hirai albums